Kamba may refer to:
Kamba people of Kenya
Bena-Kamba, a community in the Democratic Republic of the Congo
Khampa, also spelled Kamba, Tibetan people of Kham

See also
Kamba language (disambiguation)